Levichi is a rural locality (a village) and the administrative center of Levichanskoye Rural Settlement, Kosinsky District, Perm Krai, Russia. The population was 216 as of 2010. There are 8 streets.

Geography 
Levichi is located 38 km southeast of Kosa (the district's administrative centre) by road. Krasnobay is the nearest rural locality.

References 

Rural localities in Kosinsky District